Matteo Medves (born 20 June 1994) is an Italian judoka. He competes in the -66 kg weight category and won a silver medal in the 2018 European Championships.

References

External links
 
 
 

1994 births
Italian male judoka
Living people
Judoka at the 2019 European Games
European Games medalists in judo
European Games silver medalists for Italy
20th-century Italian people
21st-century Italian people